Whitby was a parliamentary constituency centred on the town of Whitby in North Yorkshire.  It returned one Member of Parliament (MP)  to the House of Commons of the Parliament of the United Kingdom, elected by the first past the post system.

History
The constituency was created by the Great Reform Act for the 1832 general election as a parliamentary borough, Whitby being at that point one of the most prosperous towns in England which had not previously been represented. (Whitby had been summoned to send members to the Protectorate Parliaments during the Civil War period, but never at any other time.) It consisted of Whitby itself and the adjoining townships of Ruswarp, Hawsker and Stainsacre, and had a population of just over 10,000.

Whitby's shipbuilding industry had been in decline even before the new borough was established, and by 1885 a separate MP for the town could no longer be justified. However, when the borough was abolished the county constituency which absorbed it was also named Whitby (strictly, the Whitby Division of the North Riding of Yorkshire): it contained all the easternmost part of the Riding apart from Scarborough (which remained a separate borough), stretching south-west to Pickering which was the only other town in the constituency.

The Whitby division was abolished for the 1918 general election, when it was partially replaced by the new Scarborough & Whitby constituency.

Members of Parliament

Election results

Elections in the 1830s

Elections in the 1840s

Elections in the 1850s

Stephenson's death caused a by-election.

Elections in the 1860s

Gladstone was appointed a Lord Commissioner of the Treasury, requiring a by-election.

Elections in the 1870s

Elections in the 1880s

At the 1885 election the constituency was redrawn to include Pickering and the hinterlands of Scarborough.

Elections in the 1890s

Elections in the 1900s

Elections in the 1910s

General Election 1914–15:

Another General Election was required to take place before the end of 1915. The political parties had been making preparations for an election to take place and by July 1914, the following candidates had been selected; 
Unionist: Gervase Beckett
Liberal:

References

Parliamentary constituencies in Yorkshire and the Humber (historic)
Constituencies of the Parliament of the United Kingdom established in 1832
Constituencies of the Parliament of the United Kingdom disestablished in 1918